eLife is a not-for-profit, peer-reviewed, open access, scientific journal for the biomedical and life sciences. It was established at the end of 2012 by the Howard Hughes Medical Institute, Max Planck Society, and Wellcome Trust, following a workshop held in 2010 at the Janelia Farm Research Campus. Together, these organizations provided the initial funding to support the business and publishing operations. In 2016, the organizations committed US$26 million to continue publication of the journal.

The current editor-in-chief is Michael Eisen (University of California, Berkeley). Editorial decisions are made largely by senior editors and members of the board of reviewing editors, all of whom are active scientists working in fields ranging from human genetics and neuroscience to biophysics, epidemiology, and ecology.

Business model

eLife is a non-profit organisation, but for long-term sustainability of the service, the journal asks for an article processing charge of US$3,000 for papers accepted for publication. 
This charge was 
reduced to US$2,000 in 2022 after the adoption of a new model without accept/reject decisions.
Authors with insufficient funding are eligible for a fee waiver.

Abstracting and indexing
The journal is abstracted and indexed in Medline, BIOSIS Previews, Chemical Abstracts Service, Science Citation Index Expanded, and Scopus.
According to the Journal Citation Reports, the journal has a 2018 impact factor of 7.080. The journal opposes the over-reliance on the impact factor by the scientific community. In an interview, Howard Hughes Medical Institute then President Robert Tjian reflected on eLife and noted, "The other big thing is, we want to kill the journal impact factor. We tried to prevent people who do the impact factors from giving us one. They gave us one anyway a year earlier than they should have. Don't ask me what it is because I truly don't want to know and don't care."

eLife Podcast
The eLife Podcast is produced by BBC Radio presenter and University of Cambridge consultant virologist Chris Smith of The Naked Scientists.

eLife digests
Most research articles published in the journal include an "eLife digest", a non-technical summary of the research findings aimed at a lay audience. Since December 2014, the journal has been sharing a selection of the digests on the blog publishing platform Medium. eLife also publishes commentary articles called "Insights", which are also written in plainer terms than the research article, but focus more on the context of the research.

Reviewing process
Randy Schekman (the first editor-in-chief) criticized Nature, Science and Cell as "luxury journals" in 2013, comparing their low acceptance levels and high impact factors with high-end "fashion designers" who deliberately inflated demand for their brand due to scarcity. During the peer review process, eLife encourages the reviewers to discuss a manuscript and agree on a common recommendation. However, the acceptance rate of eLife was 15.4% in 2015, which is similar to the acceptance rates of Nature and Science - both below 10%.

In June 2018, eLife announced that it would try an innovative peer review model (for some 300 submissions) where the editorial decision to send a manuscript out for review is tantamount to offering publication to that manuscript, thereby putting the authors in control of publication after editorial screening has been passed.

In December 2020, eLife announced a new "publish, then review" model of publishing; from July 2021 the journal will only review manuscripts already available as preprints.

On October 20, 2022, eLife announced, "From next year, eLife is eliminating accept/reject decisions after peer review, instead focusing on public reviews and assessments of preprints." All papers invited for the peer-review will be published on the eLife website as Reviewed Preprints, accompanied by an eLife assessment and public reviews. However, some editors (including Schekman) have complained that the transition to the new model was too fast, and asked for compromise, threatening to resign if their concerns were not met.

Other partners 

In April 2017, eLife was one of the founding partners in the Initiative for Open Citations.

See also

 List of open access journals

References

External links 

 
 eLife digests on Medium
 eLife Insights, digests, and podcast

English-language journals
Biology journals
Open access journals
Publications established in 2012
General medical journals
Max Planck Society
Wellcome Trust
Continuous journals